Arslanköy (also called Efrenk) is a town in Mersin Province, Turkey, with a population of 1,873 as of 2019.

Geography 

History 
Located about 3 kilometers south from the town is a small garrison fort that consists of several walls and a gate that block access to the summit of a limestone outcrop.  The masonry indicates that it dates from the early Byzantine period with additions in the 12th or 13th century during the period of the Armenian Kingdom of Cilicia.  It is located in the Taurus Mountains near the junction of several strategic roads which lead from both Çandır Castle (Papeṙōn) and the Mediterranean Sea to Cappadocia. The fortification was surveyed in 1979. 

Among the early settlers were nomadic Oghuz Turks (Turkmens) who began to use the vicinity as a summer camp in the 14th century. Later a village was established. 
Some of the most influential folk poets like Karacaoğlan of the 17th century and Dadaloğlu of the 19th century are believed to have spent some years in Arslanköy.

Arslanköy previously an ambiguous village, made news in 1947 local elections. The candidate of the opposition won the elections for village headman. A civil servant  supporting the governing party, tried to alter the official minutes . But residents of the village  resisted and fought for their preference.

Arslanköy was declared a seat of township in 1954

Economy 

Owing to high altitude, Arslanköy is one of the coolest parts of the province. The main crops are cereals and some fruits such as apples and peaches.

References 

Towns in Turkey
Populated places in Toroslar District
Populated places in Mersin Province